Robertsville is a census-designated place and unincorporated community located within Marlboro Township, in Monmouth County, New Jersey, United States. At the 2010 census, the CDP's population was 11,297.

Geography
According to the United States Census Bureau, the CDP had a total area of 5.932 square miles (15.363 km2), including 5.919 square miles (15.330 km2) of land and 0.013 square miles (0.033 km2) of water (0.21%).

Demographics

Census 2010
At the 2010 census, there were 11,297 people, 3,792 households, and 3,230.784 families living in the CDP. The racial makeup of the CDP was 84.21% (9,513) White, 2.39% (270) Black or African American, 0.03% (3) Native American, 11.7% (1,324) Asian, 0.01% (1) Pacific Islander, 0.59% (67) from other races, and 1.05% (119) from two or more races. Hispanic or Latino of any race were 4.05% (458) of the population.

Of the 3,792 households 42.4% had children under the age of 18 living with them, 77.3% were married couples living together, 6.0% had a female householder with no husband present, and 14.8% were non-families. 13.0% of households were made up of individuals, and 7.1% were one person aged 65 or older. The average household size was 2.98 and the average family size was 3.27.

The age distribution was 27.0% under the age of 18, 6.3% from 18 to 24, 20.2% from 25 to 44, 33.7% from 45 to 64, and 12.7% 65 or older. The median age was 42.8 years. For every 100 females there were 95.3 males.  For every 100 females ages 18 and older there were 92.3 males.

Education
Children residing in the Robertsville area in public school attend Robertsville Elementary School, as part of the Marlboro Township Public School District.

Transportation
Tennent Road (County Route 3), Newman Springs Road (CR 520), and the Route 18 freeway travel through Robertsville.

References

Census-designated places in Monmouth County, New Jersey
Marlboro Township, New Jersey